The Music Educators Journal is a quarterly peer-reviewed academic journal that covers in the field of education. The editor-in-chief is Ella Wilcox, and the Academic Editor is Corin Overland (University of Miami). It was established in 1914 and is currently published by SAGE Publications on behalf of the National Association for Music Education.

Abstracting and indexing 
Music Educators Journal is abstracted and indexed in:
 Academic Premier
 Arts and Humanities Search
 Educational Research Abstracts Online
 Education Resources Information Center
 General OneFile
 MLA International Bibliography
 Wilson Education Index
 Zetoc

External links 
 

SAGE Publishing academic journals
English-language journals
Music education journals
Quarterly journals
Publications established in 1914
Academic journals associated with learned and professional societies